Dinacharya (Sanskrit: दिनचर्या "daily-routine") is a concept in Ayurvedic medicine that looks at the cycles of nature and bases daily activities around these cycles. Ayurveda contends that routines help establish balance and that understanding daily cycles is useful for promoting health. Dinacharya says that each day, two cycles of change occur, that correlate with the Ayurvedic concept of dosha. Routines covered by dinacharya include:  waking time, elimination, hygiene, massage, exercise, bathing, meditation and prayer, meals, study, work, relaxation and sleeping.

See also
 Ayurveda

References 

Ayurveda
Mind–body interventions